James "Jim" Kelly was an American soccer wing half who played in the American Soccer League and earned one cap with the U.S. national team.

Professional
Kelly joined the Newark Skeeters of the American Soccer League in 1923.  His best year with the team was the 1924-1925 season when he played thirty-nine league and one league cup games.  In 1925, he began the season with Newark, but finished the season with Philadelphia Field Club.  In 1926, he joined the Brooklyn Wanderers, but saw time in only fourteen league games in two seasons.  He played one game with the Boston Wonder Workers during the 1928-1929 season and two with Bridgeport Hungaria in the fall of 1929.

National team
Kelly earned one cap with the U.S. national team in a 6-1 win over Canada on November 11, 1925.

References

External links

United States men's international soccer players
American Soccer League (1921–1933) players
Newark Skeeters players
Philadelphia Field Club players
Brooklyn Wanderers players
Boston Soccer Club players
Bridgeport Hungaria players
Year of birth missing
Year of death missing
Association football midfielders
American soccer players